Mattias Östberg (born 24 August 1977) is a Swedish footballer who plays for Hanvikens SK in Swedish Division 4 as a defender.

Career
Östberg began his career with Östansbo IS, before signing a professional contract with Ludvika FK. He also played with IFK Norrköping, before moving to England to play with then Second Division club Stoke City. He never made it into the senior squad, however played a game for the Youth Team, which they lost 3–1 to Walsall. However Östberg became a victim of the new transfer laws regarding international players, and as a result had to be released by Stoke.

Returning to Sweden, he signed with IK Brage, where he stayed for 2 seasons, before moving onto GAIS for 3 years, making over 50 appearances for the club. In 2008, he moved once more to BK Häcken.

During the 2011–12 Europa League first qualifying round Östberg scored in the opening rounds, 1–1 draw with Luxembourgian club Käerjéng 97. Häcken would go on to win 6–2 on aggregate after winning 5–1 in the second leg.

References

External links
 
  
 

1977 births
Living people
Swedish footballers
Allsvenskan players
IFK Norrköping players
GAIS players
BK Häcken players
Djurgårdens IF Fotboll players
Association football defenders
People from Falun
Sportspeople from Dalarna County